Long Branch Public Schools is a comprehensive community public school district that serves students in pre-kindergarten through twelfth grade in the city of Long Branch, in Monmouth County, New Jersey, United States. The district is one of 31 former Abbott districts statewide that were established pursuant to the decision by the New Jersey Supreme Court in Abbott v. Burke which are now referred to as "SDA Districts" based on the requirement for the state to cover all costs for school building and renovation projects in these districts under the supervision of the New Jersey Schools Development Authority.
As of the 2018–19 school year, the district, comprised of eight schools, had an enrollment of 5,786 students and 477.8 classroom teachers (on an FTE basis), for a student–teacher ratio of 12.1:1.

The district is classified by the New Jersey Department of Education as being in District Factor Group "B", the second lowest of eight groupings. District Factor Groups organize districts statewide to allow comparison by common socioeconomic characteristics of the local districts. From lowest socioeconomic status to highest, the categories are A, B, CD, DE, FG, GH, I and J.

Schools
Schools in the district (with 2018–19 enrollment data from the National Center for Education Statistics) are:
Early childhood learning centers
Lenna W. Conrow School (with 380 students; in grades PreK-K)
Bonita Potter-Brown, Principal
Joseph M. Ferraina Early Childhood Learning Center (314; PreK-K)
Aisha Wickes, Principal
Morris Avenue School (379; PreK-K)
Matthew E. Johnson, Principal
Primary schools
Amerigo A. Anastasia School (541; 1-5)
Michelle Merckx, Principal
George L. Catrambone Elementary School (876; K-5)
Jessica Cunneff, Principal
Gregory School (552; 1-5)
Nicholas Greenwood, Principal
Middle school
Long Branch Middle School (1,198; 6-8)
Christopher Volpe, Lead Principal
High school
Long Branch High School (1,499; 9-12)
Vincent Muscillo, Lead Principal
Alternative
Audrey W. Clark School / The Academy of Alternative Programs, an alternative education program
Kristine Villano, Principal 

George L. Catrambone Elementary School was constructed at a total cost over $40 million for a facility that was designed to house 800 students in a facility covering  for which construction began in 2012. With the start of the 2014-15 school year, a realignment of the district closed West End School, converted Morris Avenue School for early childhood use and repurposed Audrey W. Clark School for alternative education.

Superintendent pay
In March 2006, the New Jersey State Commission of Investigation issued a report to Governor Jon Corzine specifically and to the public in general that addressed "Questionable and Hidden Compensation for Public School Administrators". The report disclosed that the Long Branch school district had reported to the New Jersey Department of Education that Superintendent of Schools Joseph Ferraina (who retired in 2011) was receiving a base salary of $193,149 when, as the Commission of Investigation stated, he was actually receiving a total compensation of $305,099, some 58% higher than the amount reported to the State. By 2011, Ferraina was earning a base salary of $242,550.

After three years as Chief School Administrator, Michael Salvatore accepted a contract in August 2014 under which he will earn less in base pay due to the state's superintendent salary cap. The school board approved a $165,000 annual base salary for Salvatore in a contract that expires in June 2019, which is a $10,000 reduction from his previous salary with the district. However, Salvatore's newest endeavor will supplement the contract with $10,000, which entails governing the Deal School District as a shared service Superintendent.

Administration
Core members of the district's administration are:
Francisco E. Rodriguez, Superintendent
Peter E. Genovese III, Business Administrator / Board Secretary

Board of education
The district's board of education, comprised of nine members, sets policy and oversees the fiscal and educational operation of the district through its administration. As a Type II school district, the board's trustees are elected directly by voters to serve three-year terms of office on a staggered basis, with three seats up for election each year held (since 2012) as part of the November general election. The board appoints a superintendent to oversee the district's day-to-day operations and a business administrator to supervise the business functions of the district.

References

External links
Long Branch Public Schools
 
School Data for the Long Branch Public Schools, National Center for Education Statistics
New Jersey State Commission of Investigation Report

Long Branch, New Jersey
New Jersey Abbott Districts
New Jersey District Factor Group B
School districts in Monmouth County, New Jersey